The Pakistan women's national karate team represents Pakistan in international karate competitions. It is administered by the Pakistan Karate Federation (PKF). Members of the team compete at competitions including the continental and regional games (Asian and South Asian Games). At the Asian Games held in Jakarta, Indonesia in 2018, Nargis Hameedullah became the first Pakistani woman to win an individual medal (a bronze) at the Asian Games.

Events
Pakistan has sent a team to participate in the following events:
 Asian (AKF) Championships: 2012
Asian Games: 2018
 South Asian Games: 2006, 2010, 2019

History 
In 2012, a two member team participated in its first ever Asian (AKF) Championships which were held in Tashkent, Uzbekistan.

Team Members

Medals

References

Women's national team
Karate
Women's sport in Pakistan